Chakswari, also known as Chaksawari, is a Tehsil in the Mirpur District of Azad Kashmir, Pakistan. It comprises 15 Union councils including the Islamgarh Municipal Committee. Amongst the primary affectees of the Mangla Dam upraising project were Chakswari and Islamgarh.  Chakswari is 26 miles or 41.84 km from Mirpur. The political constituency code for Chakswari and Islamgarh is LA-2.

Chakswari is rapidly becoming an economic hub and commercial area of the district. Within Chakswari, the most prominent villages are Ladhar, Chak, Nagyal, and Kalyal.

History 
During the 1947 Poonch rebellion which subsequently led to the First Kashmir War, the town was a strategic location for the Muslim rebels who styled themselves as the Azad Army. It was captured and thus became a part of Pakistan.

With the advent of the Mangla Dam project, like most villages of Mirpur district; people of Kalyal migrated to the UK and other countries in the 1960s onwards.

Geography
Chakswari comprises partly plain and partly hilly areas. Chakswari has pleasant scenery and the climate is generally arid with little rainfall and is characterised by hot summers and cool winters. Its history reaches beyond the partition period of India and Pakistan. The old part of the town is divided up into a number of sub areas in which reside local and British Pakistani's with rural homes and family history tied in kinship to the creation of Chakswari. Its old bazaar is fast becoming a commercial startup hub for people who have crossed into Azad Kashmir from other parts of Azad Kashmir, Pakistan and Afghanistan who have set up shop units opposite the old bazaar.

Chakswari is divided into two parts: the historic old town where the majority of the wholesale shops, for which the town is known, are located; and the newer part, Chakswari Colony, which was built for the families who lost their homes following the construction of Mangla Dam.

Chakswari Bazaar is the local shopping centre which has brands such as the Nafees Bakery, Chicken Cottage and the synonymous Roopyal Hotel in the main bazaar.

The Raja Plaza in the main bazaar contains many small shop units and one can find many oddities being sold.

The important mosques are the Kalyal Masjid and the main mosque of Chakswari which is the Chakswari Grand Central Jamia Masjid.

Chakswari is also well known for the holy site, Noshahi Darbar located outside of the old bazaar. It links to the heritage of Noshahi Darbar in Ralmal Sharif, Pahlia, Gujrat; as well as Doga Sharif in rural Gujrat. As well as Noshahi Family in Saher Mandi in AJK. There is history of Noshahi Darbar Pir coming to Chakswari to and spreading awareness of Islam and teachings of Muhammad. There is also a Chowk named after Noshahi Darbar just outside the bazaar.

The ancient history of Chakswari can be traced back to the Old Grave Yard located in old Chakswari, leading to the land all around the old town of Chakswari. The Old Ancestral Graveyard is located near Gazal Shaav (Holy Site).

Notable parts of Chakswari include Ladhar, Susral, Panyam, Rachyal, Roopyal, Tagdew and Buna Mora.

The main Patwar areas of LA-2 Tehsil are the following:

1. Chakswari
3. Palak
4. Pind Khurd
5. Dheri Phali
6. Dheri Barwan
7. Panyam
8. Boa
9. Tang Dew
10. Kaneli
11. Mawah
12. Bajjar
13. Herdochi
14. Kalyal 
15. Potha Bainsi
16.Ladhar
17.Chak

Notable places and people

• Mian Hussain Ali – AJK State Council Member, politician, and patriarch of the Ali Family

• Ch. Abdul Majid – ex AJK PM and President of PPP AJK

• Ch. Muhammad Anwar (d.2020) – Politician & former chairman District Council Mirpur, AJK

• Ch. Mushtaq Ahmed (d. 2016) – Managing Director of Hussain Ali Construction Company (HACC)

• Ch. Raza Ali – Managing Director of Raza Group of Companies

• Ch. M Saeed – President Pakistan Chamber of Commerce, Azad Group Managing Director, Honorary British Consul for AJK, MLA from Mirpur (representing PML-N)

• Ch. Zafar Anwar – Businessman and Senior Vice President (PTI)

• Ch. Maqsood – UK Businessman residing in Stoke-on-Trent with various business interests in AJK notably the Honda Empire car showroom in Mirpur

• Ch. Muhammad Azam (b. 1929 – d. 2007) – Pakistan Air Force Squadron Leader with 36 years service and was stationed in Quetta, Karachi and Saudi Arabia

• Ch. Abdul Karim – an MLA in the early years parliament of AJK

• Ch. Qasim Majeed – MLA (representing PPP)

• Zahid Noor Journalist (Representing ARY News)
Owner TCS Franchise Chakswari, www.tcs.com.pk

• Zaman Khan – (born 2001), Cricketer

See also
 British Pakistanis

References

Populated places in Mirpur District
Tehsils of Mirpur District